James Aubrey Tregidgo (28 August 1947 – 6 April 2010), known professionally as James Aubrey, was an English stage and screen actor. He trained for the stage at the Drama Centre London, some years after making his professional acting debut in a production of Isle of Children (1962) and his screen acting debut in the film adaptation of Lord of the Flies (1963). He later performed with the Royal Shakespeare Company.

Early life and education
Aubrey was born in 1947 in Klagenfurt, Austria. His parents were Major Aubrey James Tregidgo and Edna May Tregidgo (née Boxall). He was educated at the Wolmer's Boys' School in Kingston, Jamaica, the Windsor Boys' School, at Hamm, in Germany, and St John's School, Singapore, before training for the stage at the Drama Centre London from 1967 to 1970.

Stage work
Aubrey made his first professional stage appearance at the Wilmington Playhouse in March 1962 in the role of Philip in Isle of Children. It was in this same role that he made his Broadway theatre debut, appearing in a 1962 production at the Cort Theatre which lasted only 11 performances. From 1970 to 1972, Aubrey performed at the Citizens' Theatre in Glasgow, appearing in such roles as Andrew Aguecheek in Twelfth Night and Theridamas in Tamburlaine.

Aubrey made his London stage debut at the Royal Court Theatre in June 1973 as a police constable in the premiere of Howard Brenton's Magnificence. From 1973 to 1974, Aubrey toured with the Cambridge Theatre Company as Diggory in She Stoops to Conquer and again as Aguecheek. Aubrey performed with the Royal Shakespeare Company for their 1974–75 season, appearing in such roles as Sebastian in The Tempest and Froth in Measure for Measure. He toured with the Cambridge Theatre Company again in 1979 in the roles of Mark in The Shadow Box and Tony in From the Greek. Other venues at which Aubrey appeared include the Birmingham Repertory Theatre, the Comedy Theatre and the Old Vic.

Screen work
Aubrey first appeared in a film at the age of fourteen, in the film adaptation of William Golding’s Lord of the Flies, released in 1963, taking the lead role of Ralph. He played Gavin Sorenson in the television adaptation of Bouquet of Barbed Wire (1976) and its sequel, Another Bouquet (1977). He also worked with two British filmmakers, Norman J. Warren (Terror, 1978) and Pete Walker (Home Before Midnight, 1979), and played the ill-fated pop singer B.J. in the Sex Pistols film The Great Rock 'n' Roll Swindle (1980). In 1979 played the part of Graham Hurst in the popular TV series Minder (The Bounty Hunter) and in 1974 played Horace Reynes in the Sweeney (Selected Target).

In 1986, Aubrey starred in Forever Young, directed by David Drury. He portrayed Mark in three episodes of Lytton's Diary in 1986. In 1997, he appeared in an adaptation of Robert Ludlum's The Apocalypse Watch and was also a guest star in an episode of the TV series Brief Encounters in 2006.

During his final months, Aubrey worked with a group of local independent film-makers. Overseeing casting sessions for Shadows of a Stranger at the Hub in Sleaford in early 2010, Aubrey was also set to play the lead role in the production, but died a month before filming began.

Private life
In 1970, at St Pancras, Aubrey married Agnes Kristin Hallander, a marriage which later ended in divorce.

Death
Aubrey died at his home in Cranwell Village,  Sleaford, on 6 April 2010, at the age of 62, suffering from pancreatitis.

Selected filmography
 Lord of the Flies (1963)
 The Sex Thief (1973)
 Galileo (1975)
 Terror (1978)
 Home Before Midnight (1979)
 The Great Rock 'n' Roll Swindle (1980)
 The Hunger (1983)
 Forever Young (1983)
The American Way (1986)
 Cry Freedom (1987)
 Thin Air (1988)
 The Rift (1989)
 Buddy's Song (1991)
 Spy Game (2001)

References

Bibliography
 Holmstrom, John. The Moving Picture Boy: An International Encyclopaedia from 1895 to 1995. Norwich, Michael Russell, 1996, p. 267.

External links

1947 births
2010 deaths
Alumni of the Drama Centre London
English male film actors
English male stage actors
English male television actors
Actors from Klagenfurt
Royal Shakespeare Company members
 deaths from pancreatitis